Hoceni is a commune in Vaslui County, Western Moldavia, Romania. It is composed of seven villages: Barboși, Deleni, Hoceni, Oțeleni, Rediu, Șișcani and Tomșa.

References

Communes in Vaslui County
Localities in Western Moldavia